Jack Reacher is the fictional protagonist of crime thriller novels by British author Lee Child.

Jack Reacher may also refer to:

 Jack Reacher (book series), the series of novels featuring the character, 1997–present
 Jack Reacher (film), a 2012 American action thriller directed by Christopher McQuarrie

See also
 Jack Reacher: Never Go Back, a 2016 American sequel directed by Edward Zwick

 Reacher (TV series), a 2022 television series based on the character